Cachambi is a middle-class and lower-middle-class neighborhood of the North Zone of Rio de Janeiro, Brazil. It has an HDI of 0.900.

References

Neighbourhoods in Rio de Janeiro (city)